SP Falcons, or Selenge Press Falcons, are a Mongolian professional football club from Ulaanbaatar, competing in the Mongolian National Premier League.

Foundation
Founded in 2003, SP Falcons are one of the teams representing capital Ulaanbaatar in MNPL.

Stadium
The team plays their home games at the MFF Football Centre, which has a capacity of 5,000 spectators.

Management
Currently the team is managed by the Bold M. (president) and coached by Ishdorjiin Otgonbayar who is assisted by D.Ankhbayar and E.Chinbat.

Squad 2020

References

Football clubs in Mongolia
2002 establishments in Mongolia
Association football clubs established in 2002